Chassis Plans is an American military and industrial computer systems manufacturer specializing in rackmount computers, military computers, rugged computers, industrial PCs, rackmount LCDs, single-board computer systems with passive and active backplanes and motherboard systems.  Chassis Plans is a spin-off of Industrial Computer Source.

Products
Chassis Plans specializes in providing custom and semi-custom solutions with an emphasis on systems tailored exactly to the application requirements.  A wide variety of rackmount 1U thru 5U computer systems are offered as standard products as outgrowths of custom designs.  A line of military grade LCD keyboard systems is also offered.

History
1997: Established as a spin-off of Industrial Computer Source providing engineering services and computer system designs.
1998: Recognized by Internet Telephony Center Stage for the design of the 717-BP20 Rackmount Computer.
2001: Chassis Plans expands product offering from design services to complete turnkey computer systems. 
2006: COTS Journal article "Rugged Displays Suit Up for Challenging Environments". 
2011: Honored by 2nd selection in Inc 500/5000 list for 2011.
2012: Honored by 3rd selection in Inc 500/5000 list for 2012.
2013: Honored by 4th selection in Inc 500/5000 list for 2013. #39 of Top 100 Computer Hardware Companies.
2014: Funds 'Chassis Plans Leadership in Engineering Scholarship'.
2014: Intelligent Aerospace Magazine Article - "Enhancing displays used in unmanned aircraft systems ground control stations" 
2014: COTS Journal Magazine article - "Ruggedized Servers Revamp Data-Centric Military Environments"
2014: Awards Leadership in Engineering Scholarship.
2014: Named for fifth time to Inc 500/5000 list.
2014: Secures trademarks for "Industrial Computer Source-Book" and "Military Computer Source-Book".
2015: Mil Embedded Systems magazine awards the TFX1-19 rackmount LCD an Editor's Choice Award

See also
 List of computer hardware manufacturers
 List of computer system manufacturers

References

Computer companies of the United States
Computer enclosure companies
Manufacturing companies based in San Diego
Computer companies established in 1997
1997 establishments in California